Ituma is an unincorporated community located in Holmes County, Mississippi.

Ituma is a name derived from the Choctaw language.

A post office operated under the name Ituma from 1885 to 1914.

References

Unincorporated communities in Holmes County, Mississippi
Unincorporated communities in Mississippi
Mississippi placenames of Native American origin